The Edinburgh Theological College was founded in 1810 to train Anglican clergy to serve in the Scottish Episcopal Church. In 1891 the college moved to Coates Hall in Rosebery Avenue where it gradually expanded to include residential accommodation and a library. The college’s academic hood was black lined with thistle green. The college closed in 1994 and the site is now used by St Mary's Music School.

The Edinburgh Theological College was succeeded by the Theological Institute of the Scottish Episcopal Church (TISEC) in 1995, which was itself succeeded by the Scottish Episcopal Institute (SEI) in 2015.

See also

 Alumni of Edinburgh Theological College

References

1810 establishments in Scotland
Educational institutions established in 1810
Scottish Episcopal Church
Bible colleges, seminaries and theological colleges in Scotland
Former theological colleges in Scotland
1994 disestablishments in Scotland
Educational institutions disestablished in 1994